Willie Everett Smith (born August 27, 1967) is a former professional baseball pitcher.

References

1967 births
Living people
Baseball players from Savannah, Georgia
Major League Baseball pitchers
St. Louis Cardinals players
Gulf Coast Pirates players
Watertown Pirates players
Augusta Pirates players
Harrisburg Senators players
Salem Buccaneers players
Albany-Colonie Yankees players
Columbus Clippers players
Canton-Akron Indians players
Colorado Springs Sky Sox players
Louisville Redbirds players
Wichita Wranglers players